"Lullaby" is a song by English rock band the Cure from their eighth studio album, Disintegration (1989). Released as a single on 10 April 1989, the song is the band's highest-charting single in their home country, reaching number five on the UK Singles Chart. It additionally reached number three in West Germany and Ireland while becoming a top-10 hit in several other European countries and New Zealand. The music video, directed by Tim Pope, won the British Video of the Year at the 1990 Brit Awards.

Background
The meaning of "Lullaby" has been speculated by fans, including as a metonymy for addiction, depression, or sexual assault, and Smith has offered multiple explanations as to its theme or content, such as childhood nightmares or abuse. One explanation by Smith follows that the song is about the disturbing songs his father sung to him as a kid, and the horrible ending they would always have. Tim Pope, a long-time collaborator of the Cure on many of its music videos, interprets "Lullaby" as an allegory for lead singer Robert Smith's drug-addled past.

Chart performance
Upon its release, "Lullaby" became the Cure's highest-charting hit in their home country when it reached number five on the UK Singles Chart. It remains their only single to reach the top five in the United Kingdom. In Ireland, "Lullaby" became the band's third top 10 hit and highest-charting single, reaching number three. The song also reached the top 10 in West Germany, Italy, the Netherlands, New Zealand and Norway. In North America, the song was released as the second single from Disintegration instead ("Fascination Street" was the first), but did not match its predecessor's level of success, only reaching number 74 on the Billboard Hot 100 and number 23 on the Billboard Modern Rock Chart.

Critical reception
Upon the release, a reviewer from Music & Media wrote, "Those of you who feared the worst for the Cure's artistic future after 1986's "Why Can't I Be You?" and "Hot Hot Hot", can stop worrying. Their new single is serious pop music at its best. The backing is a strong, infectious rhythm with subtle plucked violins and sweeping strings, completed by Robert Smith's whispering voice. Although this is not the easiest record to programme it has already become many European DJs' favourite." Jerry Smith from Music Week felt the Cure "are back in superb form with en envelopin marshmallow of a track, exuding atmosphere with soaring strings and breathy vocals. Sure to make a big impression on the charts and heighten anticipation for their new album, Disintegration." In their review of the album, People Magazine noted that the group "perks up sporadically" on songs like "Lullaby".

Retrospective response
In an 2019 retrospective review, Rayna Khaitan from Albumism wrote, "The thrillingly creepy "Lullaby" recalls a familiar sense of claustrophobia prevalent in the Cure's canon, only this time more than others, Smith seems a little intoxicated with the idea of surrender." Stephen Thomas Erlewine from AllMusic described the song as "eerie" and "string-laced". Another editor, Ned Raggett, stated that "Smith's detailing of the spiderman coming along to envelope [sic] and devour is classically Cure, while the tight, haunted-house vibe of the song is another winner."

Music video
The accompanying music video for "Lullaby" was filmed at a sound stage in London, England. It features Robert in bed, in a dream sequence, and the rest of the band playing tin soldiers who sporadically appear throughout the music video for a few seconds. The music video, during which Smith plays both the cannibalistic "spiderman" mentioned in the lyrics and his intended victim, concludes with Smith being swallowed by what appears to be a giant spider.

The music video, directed by Tim Pope and edited by Peter Goddard, won British Video of the Year at the 1990 Brit Awards.

Track listing

The US-only single "Fascination Street" included the B-sides from the UK release of "Lullaby". Therefore, the US release needed some new B-sides. The two live cuts, "Homesick" and "Untitled", are from the limited edition live album Entreat, which was recorded during the Disintegration Tour.

The song was remixed for single release, giving it more of an electronic feel.

 7-inch: Fiction / FISC 29 (UK)
 "Lullaby" (remix) – 4:08
 "Babble" – 4:16

 7-inch: Elektra / 7-69249 (US)
 "Lullaby" (remix)
 "Homesick" (live version)
* also released on cassette (9 46924-9)

 12-inch: Fiction / ficx 29 (UK)
 "Lullaby" (extended remix) 
 "Babble"
 "Out of Mind"

 12-inch: Elektra / 0 66664 (US)
 "Lullaby" (extended remix)
 "Homesick" (live version)
 "Untitled" (live version)

 CD: Fiction / ficcd 29 (UK)
 "Lullaby" (remix) 
 "Babble"
 "Out of Mind"
 "Lullaby" (extended remix)
* gatefold 3" CD

 CD: Elektra / 9 66664-2 (US)
 "Lullaby" (remix)
 "Lullaby" (extended remix)
 "Homesick" (live version)
 "Untitled" (live version)

Personnel
 Robert Smith – vocals, six-string bass, keyboards
 Simon Gallup – bass guitar
 Porl Thompson – guitar
 Boris Williams – drums, percussion
 Roger O'Donnell – keyboards
 Lol Tolhurst – "other instruments" (Tolhurst does not actually play on the record.)
 Mark Saunders – remix

Charts

Weekly charts

Year-end charts

Certifications

Other versions

An extended mix appears on the Cure's 1990 remix album Mixed Up.

The song has been sampled by various artists, including Just Jack in the song "Snowflakes" for his 2002 album The Outer Marker, Rachel Stevens in the song "All About Me" from her 2005 album Come and Get It, Sono in the song "Someday" from the 2007 album Panoramic View, and by metalcore outfit Motionless In White, in the song "Black Damask (The Fog), for their 2012 album Infamous. It was also sampled by hip hop artist Akala in the song "I Don't Know" on his 2007 album Freedom Lasso. It has been covered by British post-punk revival band Editors on the compilation Radio 1: Established 1967. Editors' version reappeared on Pictures of You – a tribute to Godlike Geniuses The Cure, which came with the 28 February 2009 issue of NME. "'Lullaby' is the greatest dark pop song... possibly of all years," said bassist Russell Leetch.

It was heavily sampled on the 2007 Faithless track "Spiders, Crocodiles & Kryptonite", which featured on their album To All New Arrivals. Smith provided a new recording of the part of "Lullaby"'s verses, greatly increasing their clarity compared with mix of the original Cure recording.

"Lullaby" was played live during Page & Plant's 1995 No Quarter Tour; the duo's backing band included Porl Thompson on guitar.

In popular culture
The track was used as the backing to the trailer to the TV show The Secret Circle and was featured in the British TV shows Misfits, Fresh Meat, Being Human, as well as Episode 7 of American Horror Story: Hotel.

References

1989 singles
1989 songs
The Cure songs
Fiction Records singles
Gothic rock songs
Music videos directed by Tim Pope
Song recordings produced by David M. Allen
Songs written by Boris Williams
Songs written by Lol Tolhurst
Songs written by Porl Thompson
Songs written by Robert Smith (musician)
Songs written by Roger O'Donnell